Mahbubul Alam Tara (1939–2014) was a Bangladeshi entrepreneur, politician, and member of parliament.

Early life
Tara was born in Faradnagar village at Feni on 1939. He studied in Khaiyara School, Faradnagar, and Chittagong Collegiate School. He started his political career while studying at Chittagong College. He was elected VP of the student council in 1962–63. He organized student movements against the then autocratic ruler. He Studied in the Department of Economics of University of Dhaka.

Career
Tara was involved in the 1969 mass movement in East Pakistan and actively supported the Mukti Bahini during Bangladesh Liberation War.

Tara was the Member of Parliament for constituency Feni-3 from 1991 to 1996. He was elected as a candidate of Bangladesh Nationalist Party. He was chief whip in the parliament of Bangladesh. In 1998, he was the president of Bangladesh Jatiyatabadi Krishak Dal.

Tara was popularly known as 'Tara Mia'. He was also the pioneer of Packaging industry in Bangladesh. He, along with his friends, established National Credit and Commerce Bank Limited (NCC Bank). He was Chairman of NCC Bank twice. He established Mahbubul Huq High School in his village Faradnagar.

Death
Tara died at National University Hospital at Singapore on 3 June 2014; he was suffering from lung problems.

References

External links
 http://www.parliament.gov.bd/index.php/en/mps/members-of-parliament/former-mp-s/list-of-5th-parliament-members-bangla
 http://thedailynewnation.com/news/15498/bnp-acting-secretary-general-mirza-fakhrul-islam-alamgir-among-others-at-a-condolence-meeting-on-former-chief-whip-mahbubul-alam-tara-organized-by-jatiyatabadi-krishak-dal-at-the-national-press-club-on-tuesday.html
 https://www.thedailystar.net/city/death-anniversary-1233160
 https://chattagramcollegiates.com/blog/2017/11/10/the-beginning-of-chattagram-collegiate/

Bangladesh Nationalist Party politicians
People from Feni District
University of Dhaka alumni
1939 births
2014 deaths
5th Jatiya Sangsad members